The Blake Prize, formerly the Blake Prize for Religious Art, is an Australian art prize awarded for art that explores spirituality. Since the inaugural prize in 1951, the prize was awarded annually from 1951 to 2015, and since 2016 has been awarded biennially.

, the non-acquisitive prize, awarded since 2016 by the Casula Powerhouse Arts Centre (CPAC), is worth .

History
The prize was established in Sydney in 1949 as an incentive to raise the standard of religious art and to find suitable work to decorate churches. It was founded by Jewish businessman Richard Morley, the Reverend Michael Scott SJ, a headmaster of Campion Hall, Point Piper, and subsequently rector of Aquinas College (a Catholic residential college for university students in North Adelaide), and lawyer M. Tenison. The Blake Prize is named after the artist and poet, William Blake. The inaugural Blake Prize was awarded by the Blake Society in 1951 to Justin O'Brien.

The Blake exhibitions have been a regular travelling exhibition around Australia, visiting various major cities and provincial galleries.

The award of the Blake Prize to Charles Bannon in 1954 for his Judas Iscariot was one of the most controversial in its history; this opened controversy over what constituted religious art and over "abstract expressionism" which threatened to overwhelm the exhibition.

In 2000, the prize shifted its focus from strictly religious art to an exploration of spirituality, and some of the entries proved controversial. In 2007, former prime minister John Howard and former Catholic archbishop of Sydney George Pell expressed disapproval of art works showing the Virgin Mary in a burqa, and a hologram of Christ morphing with Osama bin Laden. In 2008, The Australian's art critic Christopher Allen resigned from the judging panel over an entry by Adam Cullen showing the crucifixion of Christ.

The prize was known as the Blake Prize for Religious Art until its 56th edition in 2007, and was based at the National Art School in Darlinghurst at this time. For its 57th edition in 2008, it was rebranded the Blake Prize, subtitled "Exploring the spiritual and religious in art".

In 2008 the Blake Society, in collaboration with the New South Wales Writers' Centre (now Writing NSW), established the Blake Poetry Prize to link art and literature and to give Australian poets new possibilities to explore the nature of spirituality in the 21st century.

In 2011, Australian art historian, educator and exhibition curator Rosemary Crumlin authored a book documenting 60 years of the Blake Prize.

In 2012, the National Art School was replaced as exhibition partner by the National Trust's S. H. Ervin Gallery in Observatory Park, in Sydney's city centre, for the 61st edition of the awards.

In 2014 there were new commercial sponsors, and the venue partner became UNSW College of Fine Arts (now UNSW School of Art & Design).

The prize was administered by the Blake Society up till and including 2015. After the 63rd edition of the prize in January, chair Rod Pattenden said that it would not be able to continue owing to lack of sponsorship, suggesting that the prize was seen as "too open-minded" by religious organisations and "too religious" by secular people. In July, the Casula Powerhouse Art Centre (CPAC) and Liverpool City Council announced that they would be funding and managing the prize, with the exhibition and awards moving to Casula in Western Sydney. They promised that  would be available in perpetuity. 

In 2016 CPAC took over the prize for the 64th Blake Prize, and it became a biennial award. It now focuses on the broader spiritual arts rather than religious art. The Casula Powerhouse took over the Blake Poetry Prize in the same year.

Blake Prize for Human Justice

From 2009 until 2014, the Blake Prize for Human Justice, worth , was sponsored by the Maritime Union of Australia. The winners were:
2009: Dianne Coulter
2010: Fiona White
2011: Abdul Abdullah
2012: Saif Almurayati, a former refugee 
2013: Franz Kempf 
2014: Hedy Ritterman

Current prizes

, there are three prizes awarded by Casula Powerhouse:
 The Blake Prize, a non-acquisitive prize of 
 The Blake Established Artist Residency, a residency and solo exhibition, hosted by Casula Powerhouse

List of winners

See also 
Phoenix Prize for spiritual art
Art of Australia

References

Further reading

External links

Australian art awards
Awards established in 1949
William Blake
1949 establishments in Australia
Blake Prize for Religious Art